Billy Boy may refer to:

 "Billy Boy", a traditional folk song
 Billy Boy (1954 film), a 1954 animated short cartoon by Metro-Goldwyn-Mayer and directed by Tex Avery
 Billy Boy (2017 film), a 2017 film directed by Bradley Buecker
 Billy Boy (wrestler) (born 1977), Mexican Luchador
 Billy Boy (novel), a golf-themed novel by Bud Shrake
 "Billy Boys", a loyalist song from Glasgow, Scotland
 Billy Boy Arnold (born 1935), American blues harmonica player, singer and songwriter
 Billy Boy on Poison, an American rock and roll band from Los Angeles
 BillyBoy* (born 1960), jewelry designer
 "Willy Use a Billy... Boy", a 1995 song recorded by German eurodance project E-Rotic